The South Sudan Ministry of Health is a national ministry in the current Revitalised Transitional Government of National Unity (RTGoNU) in the Republic of South Sudan.

This national ministry in the current Government of South Sudan was formed immediately after the country gained her Independence in 2011. The incumbent minister is Yolanda Wel Deng as for the year 2023.

List of Ministers of Health

References

Health
South Sudan
South Sudan, Health